Nilson Armes Cortes (born March 29, 1977) is a Colombian football striker.
At club level he currently  plays for Once Caldas in the Copa Mustang.

A great season with Once Caldas has recently got him a callup for a friendly game against Venezuela on April 30.

External links

1977 births
Living people
Colombian footballers
Colombia international footballers
Girardot F.C. footballers
Independiente Santa Fe footballers
Millonarios F.C. players
Boyacá Chicó F.C. footballers
Once Caldas footballers
Categoría Primera A players
Categoría Primera B players
Association football midfielders
Footballers from Barranquilla